Philip D'Antoni (February 19, 1929 – April 15, 2018) was an American film and television producer. He was best known for producing the Academy Award-winning 1971 film The French Connection.

Early life
D'Antoni attended Evander Childs High School in the Bronx. He then served in the United States Army from 1946 to 1948 during the occupation of Japan after World War II. He was eventually assigned to Special Services where he entertained troops by participating in theatrical productions. After army service, he attended Fordham University from 1948 to 1950, where he worked during the day and attended school at night, and graduated with a degree in business administration.

Career
D'Antoni began his career on television with the production of the specials Sophia Loren in Rome, Elizabeth Taylor in London and Melina Mercouri in Greece.

He produced Bullitt in 1968. In 1971, he produced The French Connection, which won the Best Picture award, among other wins at the Oscars. In 1973, he produced and directed The Seven-Ups. After The Seven-Ups, D'Antoni, who held the rights to French Connection II and Gerald Walker's novel Cruising, eschewed feature filmmaking and turned his attention to television production where he enjoyed a lucrative contract with NBC.

D'Antoni's crime dramas are characterized by a cold, gritty, "street" perspective with documentary style, often filmed during the bleak New York winter months, and offer the viewer a realistic and often dangerous sense of being an insider, as opposed to using glamorous locations or produced sets.

D'Antoni's television production credits include:

 Elizabeth Taylor in London (1963)
 Sophia Loren in Rome (1964)
 The Connection (1973)
 Mr. Inside/Mr. Outside (1974)
 In Tandem (1974; pilot film for Movin' On)
 Movin' On (1974)
 Strike Force (1975)
 Shark Kill (1976)

Awards
D'Antoni won the Academy Award in 1972 for Best Picture for The French Connection. He also won the Golden Globe award for Best Motion Picture Drama for The French Connection.

References

External links
 

1929 births
2018 deaths
United States Army soldiers
American people of Italian descent
Burials at Gate of Heaven Cemetery (Hawthorne, New York)
Businesspeople from New York City
Film directors from New York City
Film producers from New York (state)
Fordham University alumni
Golden Globe Award-winning producers
People from the Bronx
Producers who won the Best Picture Academy Award
Television producers from New York City
20th-century American businesspeople